JWH-185 is a synthetic cannabinoid receptor ligand from the naphthoylindole family. It is the carbonyl-reduced derivative of related compound JWH-081. The binding affinity of JWH-185 for the CB1 receptor is reported as Ki = 17 ± 3 nM.

In the United States, all CB1 receptor agonists of the 3-(1-naphthylmethane)indole class such as JWH-185 are Schedule I Controlled Substances.

See also

 JWH-081
 JWH-184

References

JWH cannabinoids
Naphthoylindoles
CB1 receptor agonists